In approximation theory, a finite collection of points  is often called unisolvent for a space  if any element  is uniquely determined by its values on .

Simple examples in  would be the fact that two distinct points determine a line, three points determine a parabola, etc.

See also
Padua points

External links
Numerical Methods / Interpolation

Approximation theory